Candace June Clark is an American actress and model. She is well known for her roles as Debbie Dunham in the 1973 film American Graffiti, for which she received a nomination for the Academy Award for Best Supporting Actress, and Mary Lou in the 1976 film The Man Who Fell to Earth.

Early life
Born in Norman, Oklahoma to Ella (née Padberg) and Thomas Clark, a chef, she grew up in Fort Worth, Texas. She attended Green B. Trimble Technical High School.

Career
Clark's first acting role was the character of Faye in John Huston's film Fat City in 1972. She also starred or acted in  American Graffiti, The Man Who Fell to Earth (1976), The Big Sleep (1978), Q (1982), Blue Thunder (1983), Amityville 3-D (1983), Cat's Eye (1985) and At Close Range (1986) and played the role of Francine Hewitt in The Blob (1988).

She appeared in the 2009 film The Informant! as the mother of Mark Whitacre, played by Matt Damon. In 2011, Clark went to Berlin to work on the play Images of Louise Brooks, directed by Sven Mundt.

Along with her film work, she also has made guest appearances on television series, including Dating Game, Magnum, P.I., Banacek, Simon & Simon, Matlock, Baywatch Nights, Criminal Minds, and Twin Peaks: The Return.

Clark appeared on Ken Reid's TV Guidance Counselor podcast on January 20, 2017.

Personal life
Clark dated Jeff Bridges for several years after they met on the set of Fat City in 1972. She was married to Marjoe Gortner from 1978 to 1979. She married Jeff Wald in 1987 and divorced him in 1988.

Filmography

Film

Television

References

External links
 
 AllMovie.com

Living people
Actresses from Oklahoma
American film actresses
American television actresses
People from Norman, Oklahoma
People from Fort Worth, Texas
20th-century American actresses
21st-century American actresses
Year of birth missing (living people)